The Reef Fire was a wildfire that  was started by a lightning strike and took place in the Bob Marshall Wilderness in Montana in the United States, near Count Peak. Instead, it wound up merging with the Rice Ridge Fire.

Events

The Reef Fire was reported on August 13, 2017 at 5:45 PM. The fire, was located near Count Peak in the Bob Marshall Wilderness in the Flathead National Forest. The fire was being fueled by timber and sub-alpine fir. On September 3, the fire had crossed and moved downstream Babcock Creek, Youngs Creek and settled in Otter Creek. Before merging with the Rice Ridge Fire on September 5,
the fire was being monitored in its burn and was allowed to take its natural course due to concerns for firefighter safety given the rural location of the fire.

Closures and evacuations

Numerous trails and trailheads were closed due to the Reef Fire, specifically: Cardinal Peak Divide # 136, Cabin Creek #205, Pilot Peak #128, Cardinal Creek #506, Young's Creek #141, Hahn Creek #125, Hahn Creek Cut-across #124, Otter Creek #279 and Blackfoot Divide #278 are closed due to fire behavior.

References

External links
 

2017 Montana wildfires
August 2017 events in the United States
September 2017 events in the United States